2019 European Parliament elections were held in Slovenia on 26 May 2019. This was the most recent in the series of four elections held over the period of two years.

Candidates

Opinion polls 
Poll results are listed in the table below in reverse chronological order, showing the most recent first. The highest percentage figure in each polling survey is displayed in bold, and the background shaded in the leading party's colour. The projected numbers of MP's per party, if available, are listed in brackets. In the instance that there is a tie, then no figure is shaded. The lead column on the right shows the percentage-point difference between the two parties with the highest figures. Poll results use the date the survey's fieldwork was done, as opposed to the date of publication. However, if such date is unknown, the date of publication will be given instead.

Results

List of elected MEPs

Notes

Inaccessible polling places dispute 
Before the 2015 same-sex marriage referendum, two voters with disabilities requested that the authorities make their polling places accessible. Their requests were denied, and the courts rejected their lawsuits and appeals. Before the 2019 European Parliament elections, they extended their requests to these elections. When the authorities rejected their requests, they submitted, together with the Slovenian Disability Rights Association (Drupis), applications to the European Court of Human Rights. In January 2020, the Court communicated the cases with the government of Slovenia. As of January 2020, the cases, called Toplak v. Slovenia and Mrak v. Slovenia, are ongoing.

The Right to Vote by Persons with Intellectual Disabilities 
Before the 2019 European Parliament elections, disability groups Sonček and Slovenian Disability Rights Association, and a law professor Jurij Toplak, called for legislative amendments for the recognition of the right to vote for persons with disabilities, in line with the Convention on the Rights of Persons with Disabilities. They also initiated proceedings with the Constitutional Court of Slovenia, which rejected three of their appeals. They filed a complaint with the European Commission and asked for an infringement procedure. As of September 2020, the procedure is ongoing.

References

2019
2019 in Slovenia
Slovenia